Pedanochiton is a Permian Neoloricate chiton.

References

Carboniferous molluscs
Permian molluscs
Paleozoic molluscs of North America
Chitons